The city of Kampala, Uganda's capital, is administered by the Kampala Capital City Authority (KCCA). KCCA is administratively divided into five divisions, each headed by a mayor. The whole city is then headed by the Lord Mayor. The current Lord Mayor of Kampala is Erias Lukwago.

Overview
The five divisions that comprise the city of Kampala are:

References

External links
Website of Kampala Capital City Authority

Neighborhoods of Kampala
Kampala Capital City Authority